The People's Party of Andalusia (PP), informally also known as the Andalusian People's Party (PPA) is the regional wing of the Spanish People's Party operating in Andalusia. It will be the largest political party in the Parliament of Andalusia, and have an outright majority following the elections in 2022.

Party leaders
Gabino Puche, 1989–1993
Javier Arenas, 1993–1999
Teófila Martínez, 1999–2004
Javier Arenas, 2004–2012
Juan Ignacio Zoido, 2012–2014
Juan Manuel Moreno Bonilla, 2014–present

Electoral performance

Parliament of Andalusia

Cortes Generales

European Parliament

Notes

References

People's Party (Spain)
Political parties in Andalusia